Microsoft Research (MSR) is the research subsidiary of Microsoft. It was created in 1991 by Richard Rashid, Bill Gates and Nathan Myhrvold with the intent to advance state-of-the-art computing and solve difficult world problems through technological innovation in collaboration with academic, government, and industry researchers. The Microsoft Research team has more than 1,000 computer scientists, physicists, engineers, and mathematicians, including Turing Award winners, Fields Medal winners, MacArthur Fellows, and Dijkstra Prize winners.

Between 2010 and 2018, 154,000 AI patents were filed worldwide, with Microsoft having by far the largest percentage of those patents, at 20%. According to estimates in trade publications, Microsoft spent about $6 billion annually in research initiatives from 2002-2010 and has spent from $10–14 billion annually since 2010.

Microsoft Research has made significant advances in the field of AI which it has infused in its products including Kinect, Bing, Holo Lens, Cortana, Microsoft Translator, Linkedin, Havok and Dynamics to provide its customers with more benefits and better service.

The mission statement of MSR is:
 Expand the state of the art in each of the areas in which we do research
 Rapidly transfer innovative technologies into Microsoft products
 Ensure that Microsoft products have a future

Key people
Microsoft Research includes the core Microsoft Research labs and Microsoft Research AI, Microsoft Research NExT (for New Experiences and Technologies), and other incubation efforts all directed by corporate vice president Peter Lee.

Research areas 
Microsoft research is categorized into the following broad areas:

Microsoft Research sponsors the Microsoft Research Fellowship for graduate students.

Research laboratories 
Microsoft has research labs around the world including the following non-exhaustive list:

 Microsoft Research Redmond was founded on the Microsoft Redmond campus in 1991. It has about 350 researchers and is headed by Donald Kossmann. The bulk of research on the Redmond, Washington campus focuses on areas such as theory, artificial intelligence, machine learning, systems and networking, security, privacy, HCI, and wearable technologies.
 Microsoft Research Cambridge was founded in the United Kingdom in 1997 by Roger Needham and is headed by Christopher Bishop. Antony Rowstron and Abigail Sellen are Deputy Directors. The lab conducts research on  topics including machine learning, security and information retrieval, and maintains close ties to the University of Cambridge and the University of Cambridge Computer Laboratory.
 Microsoft Research Asia (MSRA) was founded in Beijing in November 1998. It has expanded rapidly and now has more than 300 researchers and developers, along with approximately 300 visiting scientists and students (including its new satellite office in Shanghai). Its focus includes natural user interfaces, multimedia, data-intensive computing, search and online advertising, NLP, and computer science fundamentals.
 Microsoft Research India is sited in Bengaluru (Bangalore) and is headed by Sriram Rajamani.
 Microsoft Research Station Q, on the campus of the University of California, Santa Barbara, was founded in 2005. Its collaborators explore theoretical and experimental approaches to creating the quantum analog of the traditional bit—the qubit. The group is led by Michael Freedman.
 Microsoft Research New England was established in 2008 in Cambridge, Massachusetts adjacent to the MIT campus by Jennifer Chayes who also managed the New York and Montreal labs. The lab is now managed by Susan Dumais. The lab collaborates with the broader research community and pursues  interdisciplinary  research that brings together computer scientists and social scientists to develop future applications.
 Microsoft Research New York City was established on May 3, 2012.  Susan Dumais serves as Managing Director of this location as well as the New England and Montreal labs. The lab collaborates with academia and other Microsoft Research labs in computational and behavioral social sciences, computational economics and prediction markets, machine learning, and information retrieval.
 Microsoft Research Montreal was established after the acquisition of Maluuba by Microsoft in 2017. Susan Dumais serves as Managing Director of this location as well as the New England and New York City labs. The lab collaborates with academia and other Microsoft Research labs in natural language processing (specifically machine reading comprehension), deep learning and reinforcement learning.

Former research laboratories 
 Microsoft Research Silicon Valley, located in Mountain View, California, was founded in August 2001 and closed in September 2014. Silicon Valley research focused on distributed computing and included security and privacy, protocols, fault-tolerance, large-scale systems, concurrency, computer architecture, Internet search and services, and related theory.

Collaborations 
Microsoft Research invests in multi-year collaborative joint research with academic institutions at Barcelona Supercomputing Center, INRIA, Carnegie Mellon University,  Massachusetts Institute of Technology, São Paulo Research Foundation (FAPESP), the Microsoft Research Centre for Social NUI and others.

See also 
 Microsoft Award
 Microsoft Research Maps

References

External links 

 
 The Microsoft Research Blog
 Microsoft Developing Project (news archive from Softpedia)
 Microsoft Research Asia local Chinese website

 
1991 establishments in the United States
Computer science research organizations
Organizations established in 1991
Research and development organizations
Research institutes in Washington (state)